Prairie Chickens is a 1943 American Western film and a sequel to Dudes are Pretty People (1942) and Calaboose (1943), Western films from "Hal Roach's Streamliners", a series of approximately 50-minute comedic movies, in this case directed by Hal Roach, Jr. and starring Jimmy Rogers as "Jimmy" and Noah Beery, Jr. as "Pidge Crosby" (Beery's real-life nickname was "Pidge"). The supporting cast features comedy veteran Raymond Hatton, who had been an unofficial comedy partner with Beery's uncle Wallace Beery in several pictures two decades earlier, and the featurette's running time is 48 minutes.

Cast
 Jimmy Rogers as Jimmy
 Noah Beery, Jr. as Pidge
 Joe Sawyer as Albertson
 Marjorie Woodworth as Lucy
 Jack Norton as Henry Lewis-Clark III
 Raymond Hatton as Jefferson 'Jeff' Gibson
 Rosemary La Planche as Yola

External links
 Prairie Chickens in the Internet Movie Database

1943 films
American black-and-white films
1943 Western (genre) films
American Western (genre) films
American sequel films
1940s English-language films
1940s American films